Yedoma is a rural locality (a village) in Kevrolskoye Rural Settlement of Pinezhsky District, Arkhangelsk Oblast, Russia. The population was 6 as of 2010.

Geography 
Yedoma is located on the Pinega River, 12 km southeast of Karpogory (the district's administrative centre) by road. Kevrola is the nearest rural locality.

References 

Rural localities in Pinezhsky District